The Bagrationi dynasty is a royal dynasty which reigned in Georgia from the Middle Ages until the early 19th century, being among the oldest extant Christian ruling dynasties in the world. In modern usage, the name of the dynasty is sometimes Hellenized and referred to as the Georgian Bagratids, also known in English as the Bagrations.

The origins of the dynasty are disputed. The early Georgian Bagratids gained the Principality of Iberia through dynastic marriage after succeeding the Chosroid dynasty at the end of the 8th century. In 888 Adarnase IV of Iberia restored the Georgian monarchy; various native polities then united into the Kingdom of Georgia, which prospered from the 11th to the 13th century. This period of time, particularly the reigns of David IV the Builder (1089–1125) and of his great-granddaughter Tamar the Great (1184–1213) inaugurated the Georgian Golden Age in the history of Georgia.

After fragmentation of the unified Kingdom of Georgia in the late 15th century, the branches of the Bagrationi dynasty ruled the three breakaway Georgian kingdoms, the Kingdom of Kartli, the Kingdom of Kakheti, and the Kingdom of Imereti, until Russian annexation in the early-19th century. While the 3rd article of the 1783 Treaty of Georgievsk guaranteed continued sovereignty for the Bagrationi dynasty and their continued presence on the Georgian throne, the Russian Empire later broke the terms of the treaty and fully annexed the protectorate. The dynasty persisted within the Russian Empire as an Imperial Russian noble family until the 1917 February Revolution. The establishment of Soviet rule in Georgia in 1921 forced some members of the family to accept demoted status and loss of property in Georgia. Other members relocated to Western Europe, but some Bagrations repatriated after Georgia regained independence in 1991.

Origins

The earliest Georgian forms of the dynastic name are Bagratoniani, Bagratuniani and Bagratovani, changed subsequently into Bagrationi. These names as well as the Armenian Bagratuni and the modern designation Bagratid mean "the children of Bagrat" or "the house of/established by Bagrat", Bagrat being a given name of Iranian origin. The origins of the Bagratid dynasty is still matter of debate between Georgian and Armenian scholars. Georgian scholars argue that the Bagrationis were of Georgian origin, while Armenian and Western scholars believe them to be a branch of the Armenian Bagratunis.

According to a tradition first recorded in the work of the 11th-century Georgian chronicler Sumbat Davitis-Dze and repeated much later by Prince Vakhushti Bagrationi (1696–1757), the dynasty claimed descent from the biblical king and prophet David and came from Israel around 530 AD. The tradition had it that of seven refugee brothers of the Davidic line, three of them settled in Armenia and the other four arrived in Kartli (also known as Iberia), where they intermarried with the local ruling houses and acquired some lands in hereditary possession, with one of the four brothers, Guaram (died in 532), founding a line subsequently called Bagrationi after his son Bagrat. A successor, Guaram, was installed as a presiding prince of Iberia under the Byzantine protectorate, receiving on this occasion the Byzantine court title of Kouropalates in 575. Thus, according to this version, began the dynasty of the Bagratids, who ruled until 1801.

This tradition enjoyed a general acceptance until the early 20th century. The Jewish origin, let alone the biblical descent, of the Bagratids has been discounted by modern scholarship. Cyril Toumanoff's research concluded that the Georgian Bagratids branched out of the Armenian Bagratid dynasty in the person of Adarnase, whose father Vasak (son of Ashot III the Blind, presiding prince of Armenia from 732 to 748) passed to Kartli following an abortive uprising against Arab rule in 775. Adarnase’s son, Ashot I, acquired the Principality of Iberia in 813 and thus founded the last royal house of Georgia. Accordingly, the legend of the Davidic origin of the Georgian Bagratids was a further development of the earlier claim entertained by the Armenian dynasty, as given in the work of the Armenian author Moses of Khorene. Once the Georgian branch, which had quickly acculturated in the new environment, assumed royal power, the myth of their biblical origin helped to maintain their legitimacy and became a major ideological pillar of their millennium-long rule of Georgia.

The generation-by-generation history of the Bagrationi dynasty begins only in the late 8th century. Toumanoff claimed that the first Georgian branch of the Bagratids may be traced as far back as the 2nd century AD, when they were said to rule over the princedom of Odzrkhe in what is now southern Georgia. The Odzrkhe line, known in the medieval annals as the Bivritianis, lasted until the 5th century AD. They cannot, however, be considered the direct ancestors of the later Bagratids who eventually restored Georgian royal authority. Pavle Ingorokva suggested that the Bagrations were a branch of the Pharnavazid dynasty of the Kingdom of Iberia.

History

Early dynasty 

The Bagrationi family had grown in prominence by the time the Georgian monarchy (Caucasian Iberia) fell to the Sassanid Persian Empire in the 6th century, and the leading local princely families were exhausted by Arab attacks. The rise of the new dynasty was made possible by the extinction of the Guaramids and the near-extinction of the Chosroids, the two earlier dynasties of Iberia with whom the Bagratids extensively intermarried, and also by the Abbasid preoccupation with their own civil wars and conflict with the Byzantine Empire. Although Arab rule did not allow them a foothold in the ancient capital of Tbilisi and eastern Kartli, the Bagratids successfully maintained their initial domain in Klarjeti and Meskheti and, under the Byzantine protectorate, extended their possessions southward into the northwestern Armenian marches to form a large polity conventionally known in modern history as Tao-Klarjeti. In 813, the new dynasty acquired, with Ashot I, the hereditary title of presiding prince of Iberia (Kartli), to which the emperor attached the honorific of kourapalates.

Despite the revitalization of the monarchy, Georgian lands remained divided among rival authorities, with Tbilisi remaining in Arab hands. The sons and grandsons of Ashot I established three separate branches – the lines of Kartli, Tao, and Klarjeti – frequently struggling with each other and with neighboring rulers. The Kartli line prevailed; in 888, with Adarnase I, it restored the indigenous Iberian royal authority dormant since 580. His descendant Bagrat III was able to consolidate his inheritance in Tao-Klarjeti and the Abkhazian Kingdom, due largely to the diplomacy and conquests of his energetic foster-father David III of Tao.

Golden Age

This unified monarchy maintained its precarious independence from the Byzantine and Seljuk empires throughout the 11th century, flourished under David IV the Builder (1089–1125), who repelled the Seljuk attacks and essentially completed the unification of Georgia with the re-conquest of Tbilisi in 1122. With the decline of Byzantine power and the dissolution of the Great Seljuk Empire, Georgia became one of the pre-eminent nations of the Christian East, her pan-Caucasian empire stretching, at its largest extent, from the North Caucasus to northern Iran, and eastwards into Asia Minor.

In spite of repeated incidents of dynastic strife, the kingdom continued to prosper during the reigns of Demetrios I (1125–1156), George III (1156–1184), and especially, his daughter Tamar the Great (1184–1213). With the death of George III the main male line became extinct and the dynasty continued through the marriage of Queen Tamar with the Alan prince David Soslan, of reputed Bagratid descent.

Downfall 
The invasions by the Khwarezmians in 1225 and the Mongols in 1236 terminated Georgia’s "golden age". The struggle against the Mongol rule created a dyarchy, with an ambitious lateral branch of the Bagrationi dynasty holding sway over western Georgia (Imereti). There was a brief period of reunion and revival under George V the Brilliant (1299–1302, 1314–1346), but the eight onslaughts of the Turco-Mongol conqueror Timur between 1386 and 1403 dealt a great blow to the Georgian kingdom. About a century later, its unity was finally shattered by two rival Turkic federations; the Kara Koyunlu, and the Ak Koyunlu. By 1490/91, the once powerful monarchy fragmented into three independent kingdoms – Kartli (central to eastern Georgia), Kakheti (eastern Georgia), and Imereti (western Georgia) – each led by a rival branch of the Bagrationi dynasty, and into five semi-independent principalities – Odishi-Mingrelia, Guria, Abkhazia, Svaneti, and Samtskhe – dominated by their own feudal clans.

During the three subsequent centuries, the Georgian rulers maintained their perilous autonomy as subjects under the Turkish Ottoman and Persian Safavid, Afsharid, and Qajar domination, although sometimes serving as little more than puppets in the hands of their powerful suzerains. In this period, in order to receive investiture from their suzerains, as a necessary prequisite, many Georgian rulers converted to Islam.

The line of Imereti, incessantly embroiled in civil war, continued with many breaks in succession, and the kingdom was only relatively spared from the encroachments of its Ottoman suzerains, while Kartli and Kakheti were similarly subjected to its Persian overlords, whose efforts to annihilate the fractious vassal kingdoms were in vain, and the two eastern Georgian monarchies, survived to be reunified in 1762 under King Erekle II, who united in his person both the Kakhetian and Kartlian lines, the latter surviving in male descent in the branch of Mukhraneli since 1658.

Last monarchs 

In 1744, Erekle II and his father Teimuraz II were granted the kingships of Kakheti and Kartli respectively by their overlord Nader Shah, as a reward for their loyalty. Following Nader Shah's death in 1747, Erekle II and Teimuraz II capitalized on the eruption of instability, and declared de facto independence. After Teimuraz II died in 1762, Erekle II succeeded his father as ruler of Kartli, and united the two kingdoms in a personal union as the Kingdom of Kartli-Kakheti, becoming the first Georgian ruler to preside over a politically unified eastern Georgia in three centuries. At about the same time, Karim Khan Zand had ascended the Iranian throne; Erekle II quickly tendered his de jure submission to the new Iranian ruler, however, de facto, he remained autonomous throughout the entire Zand period.

Erekle II (Hercules) achieved a degree of stability in Kartli-Kakheti and established political hegemony in eastern Transcaucasia. In the 1783 Treaty of Georgievsk, he placed his kingdom under the protection of Imperial Russia. The latter failed, however, to provide timely help when the Persian ruler Agha Mohammad Khan Qajar captured, sacked and ravaged Tbilisi in 1795 to compel severance of Georgian ties to Russia, as he sought to re-establish Persia's traditional suzerainty over the region.

After the death of Erekle in 1798, his son and successor, King George XII, renewed a request for protection from Emperor Paul I of Russia, and urged him to intervene in the bitter dynastic feud among the numerous sons and grandsons of the late Erekle. Paul offered to incorporate the Kingdom of Kartli-Kakheti into the Russian Empire, while reserving to its native dynasty a degree of internal autonomy – essentially, mediatisation, and in 1799 the Russians marched into Tbilisi. Negotiations of terms were still in process, when Paul signed a manifesto on December 18, 1800, unilaterally declaring the annexation of Kartli-Kakheti to the Russian Empire. This proclamation was kept secret until the death of King George on December 28. His eldest son, the Tsarevich Davit, had been formally acknowledged as heir apparent by Emperor Paul on 18 April 1799, but his accession as king after his father's death was not recognized.

On September 12, 1801, Emperor Alexander I of Russia formally re-affirmed Paul’s determination, deposing the Bagrationi dynasty from the Georgian throne. Although divided among themselves, some of the Bagrationi princes resisted Russian annexation, trying to instigate rebellion. Most of them were subsequently arrested and deported from Georgia.

The reign of the House of Imereti came to an end less than a decade later. On April 25, 1804, the Imeretian king Solomon II, nominally an Ottoman vassal, was persuaded to conclude the Convention of Elaznauri with Russia, on terms similar to those of the Treaty of Georgievsk. Yet the Russian forces dethroned Solomon on February 20, 1810. Defeated during a subsequent rebellion to regain power, he died in exile in Trabzon, Ottoman Turkey, in 1815. Russian rule over Georgia was eventually acknowledged in various peace treaties with Iran and the Ottomans and the remaining Georgian territories were absorbed by the Russian Empire in a piecemeal fashion in the course of the 19th century.

Bagrationi in Russia 

In the Russian Empire, the Bagrationis became a prominent family of aristocrats. The most famous was Prince Pyotr Bagration, a great-grandson of King Jesse of Kartli who became a Russian general and hero of the Patriotic War of 1812. His brother Prince Roman Bagration also became a Russian general, distinguishing himself in the Russo-Persian War (1826–1828), and was the first to enter Yerevan in 1827. Roman Bagration was also known for his patronage of the arts, literature and theatre. His home theater in Tbilisi was regarded as one of the finest in the Caucasus. His son Prince Pyotr Romanovich Bagration became governor of the Tver region and later governor-general of the Baltic provinces. He was also a metallurgic engineer known for the development of gold cyanidation in Russia. Prince Dmitry Petrovich Bagration was a Russian general who fought in World War I in the Brusilov Offensive and later joined the Red Army.

Bagrationi today 
The majority of the Bagrationi family left Georgia after the Red Army took over Tbilisi in 1921.

Mukhrani branch 

The House of Mukhrani is the most senior patrilinear branch of the Bagrationi dynasty, descending directly from King Constantine II of Georgia. Originally a cadet branch of the former Royal House of Kartli, they became the genealogically seniormost line of the Bagrationi family in the early 20th century; and although this elder branch had lost the rule of Kartli by 1724, it retained the Principality of Mukhrani until its annexation by Russia, along with Kartli-Kakheti, in 1800.

This branch of the family is related to the House of Borbón, the House of Wittelsbach, the House of Habsburg-Lorraine, and the House of Romanov. A member of this branch, Princess Leonida Georgievna Bagration-Moukhransky, married Vladimir Cyrillovich, Grand Duke of Russia, and became the mother of one of the claimants to the Romanov legacy, Maria Vladimirovna, Grand Duchess of Russia. The overwhelming majority of regnant and non-regnant Royal Houses recognize Prince Davit's claim to the Headship of the Royal House of Georgia.

In 1942 Prince Irakli (Erekle) Bagrationi-Mukhraneli, of the genealogically senior branch of the dynasty, proclaimed himself head of the Royal House of Georgia. He founded the Union of Georgian Traditionalists in exile. His second wife, Maria Antonietta Pasquini, daughter of Ugo, Count di Costafiorita, bore him a son and heir, but died in childbirth in February 1944. In August 1946 the widower married Princess María Mercedes de Baviera y Borbón, a granddaughter of King Alfonso XII, and daughter of Don Fernando de Baviera y Borbón, who had renounced his royal rights in Bavaria to become a naturalised infante in Spain.

Beginning in the 1990s, senior members of the Bagrationi-Mukhraneli descendants began re-patriating to Georgia from Spain, ending generations of exile. Irakli's elder son, Prince Georgi Bagrationi-Mukhraneli, was officially recognized by government and church leaders when he brought his father's remains from Spain to rest with those of his ancestors in Svetitskhoveli Cathedral at Mtskheta in 1995, and moved to Tbilisi in 2005, where he died. His eldest son, Prince Irakli (Erekle), born in 1972, deferred his dynastic claim to his younger brother, Prince Davit (born 1976). Thus, Prince Davit — who moved to Tbilisi and reclaimed his Georgian citizenship — became Head of the Family Council and the Mukhraneli dynastic titles.

Gruzinsky branch

The Bagration-Gruzinsky line, although junior to the Princes of Mukhrani genealogically, reigned over the kingdom of Kakheti, re-united the two realms in the kingdom of Kartli-Kakheti in 1762, and did not lose sovereignty until Russian annexation in 1800.

Prince Nugzar Petrovich Bagration-Gruzinski (born 1950) is the most senior known patrilineal descendant of Kartli-Kakheti's last king, George XII, and is, as such, head of the Kakhetian branch of the dynasty which, although genealogically junior to the Mukhranelis, has reigned more recently, not having lost the throne of a Georgian kingdom until 1800.

Nugzar is well known in Georgia  because he has lived his entire life in Tbilisi, and experienced with other Georgians both the country's subordination to the Soviet regime and its liberation since 1991. A theatrical and cinema director, his father, Prince Petre Bagration-Gruzinski (1920–1984), was a poet, and authored lyrics to the anthem, "Song of Tiflis".

As Nugzar has no male issue, Prince Evgeny Petrovich Gruzinsky (born 1947), the great-great grandson of Bagrat's younger brother Ilia (1791–1854), who lives in the Russian Federation, is considered to be an heir presumptive within the same primogeniture principle. Despite basing his claim on male primogeniture, Nugzar argues in favor of having his eldest daughter, Anna, designated as his heir.

Imereti branch

Various sources present three different lines as the head of the House of Imereti, potential claimants to the long defunct Kingdom of Imereti, the last of the three Georgian kingdoms to lose its independence in 1810.

The male line descending from the deposed David II of Imereti became extinct in 1978 when Prince Constantine Imeretinski died. He was survived by three daughters of his older brother.

However, Prince Nugzar Petrovich Bagration-Gruzinski claims that the headship of the Imereti branch had – for one reason or another – transferred in the early 20th century to a cadet branch descending from an older son of Prince Bagrat of Imereti. This branch died out in the male line in 1937 and in the female line in 2009.

The third claim names another branch descending from Prince Bagrat's younger natural son. This line survives in the male line and is headed by Prince David Bagrationi (born 1948) (not to be confused with his younger namesake from the Mukhrani branch).

The current claimant is Irakli Davitis Dze Bagrationi (Georgian: ირაკლი დავითის ძე ბაგრატიონი), head of the Georgian scion of the royal Bagrationi dynasty of Imereti, the direct male-line descendant of the kings of Imereti, the direct descendant of Alexander V (Georgian: ალექსანდრე V) (c. 1703/4 – March 1752), of the Bagrationi Dynasty, King of Imereti (western Georgia). Irakli is a son of David Bragationi and Irina Kobakhidze, born 10 July 1982 in Terjola, Imereti, Georgia. He is the future successor and head of the House of Bagrationi-Imereti. Irakli finished school in Ghvankiti, Terjola Municipality. He served in the National Guard of Georgia and reached lieutenant's rank. He has BA and MA from Georgian Technical University in automotive engineering. Irakli has been recognized by the Patriarch of Georgia, as well as the Ecumenical Patriarch of Constantinople, as well as the Unione della Nobiltà Bizantina (Ένωση της Βυζαντινής ευγένειας).

Union of Bagrationi branches

Prince Nugzar's daughter, Princess Ana, a divorced teacher and journalist with two daughters, married Prince Davit Bagrationi-Mukhraneli, on 8 February 2009 at the Tbilisi Sameba Cathedral. The marriage united the Gruzinsky and Mukhrani branches of the Georgian royal family, and drew a crowd of 3,000 spectators, officials, and foreign diplomats, as well as extensive coverage by the Georgian media.

The dynastic significance of the wedding lay in the fact that, amidst the turmoil in political partisanship that has roiled Georgia since its independence in 1991, Patriarch Ilia II of Georgia publicly called for restoration of the monarchy as a path toward national unity in October 2007. Although this led some politicians and parties to entertain the notion of a Georgian constitutional monarchy, competition arose among the old dynasty's princes and supporters, as historians and jurists debated which Bagrationi has the strongest hereditary right to a throne that has been vacant for two centuries.

Although some monarchists support the Gruzinsky branch's claim, others — including most Royal Houses — support that of the re-patriated Mukhraneli branch. Both branches descend from the medieval kings of Georgia down to Constantine II of Georgia who died in 1505, and continue as unbroken, legitimate male lines into the 21st century.

Davit is the only member of his branch who retains Georgian citizenship and residence since the death of his father, Prince George Bagration-Mukhraneli, in 2008. Aside from his unmarried elder brother Irakli, Davit is the heir male of the Bagrationi family, while the bride's father is the most senior descendant of the last Bagrationi to reign over the united kingdom of eastern Georgia. The marriage between Nugzar Gruzinsky's heiress and the Mukhrani heir may resolve their rivalry for the claim to the throne.

Prince David and Princess Anna became the parents of a boy on 27 September 2011, Prince Giorgi Bagration Bagrationi, who, in his person, potentially unites the Mukhraneli and Gruzinsky claims. If no other Bagrationi prince is born in either the Gruzinsky or Mukhraneli branch who is of senior descent by primogeniture, and he survives those now living, Prince Giorgi will become the heir male of the House of Bagrationi and the heir general of George XIII of Georgia.

Gallery of some Georgian monarchs of Bagrationi dynasty

See also
Georgian monarchs family tree of Bagrationi dynasty of Tao-Klarjeti
Georgian monarchs family tree of Bagrationi dynasty of united Georgia
Georgian monarchs family tree of Bagrationi dynasty of Kartli
Georgian monarchs family tree of Bagrationi dynasty of Kakheti
Georgian monarchs family tree of Bagrationi dynasty of Imereti
Monarchism in Georgia

References

Sources 

Mikaberidze, A. (2015) Historical Dictionary of Georgia, Rowman & Littlefield, 
Baddeley, JF, Gammer M (INT) (2003), The Russian Conquest of the Caucasus, Routledge (UK),  (First published in 1908; 1999 edition, reprinted in 2003)
Lang, DM (1957), The Last Years of the Georgian Monarchy: 1658-1832, New York: Columbia University Press.
 
 
 
 
Rapp, SH (2003), Studies In Medieval Georgian Historiography: Early Texts And Eurasian Contexts, Peeters Bvba .

Further reading 

 A. Khakhanov. "Histoire de la Georgie", Paris, 1900 (in French)
 A. Manvelichvili. "Histoire de la Georgie", Paris, 1951 (in French)
 A. Manvelishvili. "Russia and Georgia. 1801-1951", Vol. I, Paris, 1951 (in Georgian)
 K. Salia. "History of the Georgian Nation", Paris, 1983
 Kartlis Tskhovreba, vol. I-IV, Tbilisi, 1955-1973 (in Georgian)
 P. Ingorokva. Giorgi Merchule (a monograph), Tbilisi, 1954 (in Georgian)
 E. Takaishvili. "Georgian chronology and the beginning of the Bagratid rule in Georgia".- Georgica, London, v. I, 1935
 Sumbat Davitis dze. "Chronicle of the Bagration's of Tao-Klarjeti", with the investigation of Ekvtime Takaishvili, Tbilisi, 1949 (in Georgian)
 "Das Leben Kartlis", ubers. und herausgegeben von Gertrud Patch, Leipzig, 1985 (in German)
 V. Guchua, N. Shoshiashvili. "Bagration's".- Encyclopedia "Sakartvelo", vol. I, Tbilisi, 1997, pp. 318–319 (in Georgian)

External links 

Official Site of the Royal House of Bagrationi of Georgia, Mukhrani Branch
Official Site of the Royal House of Bagrationi of Georgia, Gruzinsky Branch

 
Davidic line